Andrea Monica Martin (April 14, 1972 – September 27, 2021) was an American R&B singer-songwriter and record producer.

Career
She was primarily known for writing hit songs (often with longtime partner Ivan Matias) for artists like Toni Braxton ("I Love Me Some Him"), Monica ("Before You Walk Out of My Life"), Angie Stone ("Wish I Didn't Miss You"), En Vogue ("Don't Let Go (Love)"), SWV ("You're the One"), and British singer Leona Lewis ("Better in Time"). She has written a number of hits in both the UK and the US, as well as non-charting singles for the likes of Paloma Faith ("Trouble with My Baby"), Nelly ("Fly Away"), RBD ("Wanna Play") and Jennifer Hudson ("I Still Love You").

A major in vocal music, Andrea graduated from Fiorello H. LaGuardia High School of Music & Art and Performing Arts in 1990.

In 1998, Martin released her only album The Best of Me, as well as a few singles. Her single "Let Me Return the Favor" reached No. 82 on the Billboard Hot 100 in November 1998, and her single "Share the Love" was remixed for clubs and peaked at No. 4 on the Billboard Dance Charts in June 1999. That same year, she appeared in concert on BET's Girls Night Out, headlining with then-Arista labelmates Monica, Faith Evans, Deborah Cox, and Shanice. She appeared as a backup vocalist on many albums.

Death
Martin died at a hospital in New York City on September 27, 2021, at age 49.

Discography

Studio albums

Singles

As lead artist

As featured artist

Album appearances

Notes

In the charts as a writer

 UK chart data from polyhex.com

References

External links
 

1972 births
2021 deaths
20th-century African-American women singers
African-American women singer-songwriters
American rhythm and blues singer-songwriters
Arista Records artists
Musicians from Brooklyn
A
Sony Music Publishing artists
21st-century African-American women singers
Singer-songwriters from New York (state)